Robert Cornelius van der Zant (born 2 February 1975) is a former medley swimmer who competed for Australia at the 2000 Summer Olympics in Sydney.  There he finished in fourteenth position in the 200-metre individual medley.

See also
 List of Commonwealth Games medallists in swimming (men)

References

1975 births
Living people
Sportsmen from Queensland
Australian male medley swimmers
Olympic swimmers of Australia
Swimmers at the 2000 Summer Olympics
Swimmers from Brisbane
Australian people of Dutch descent
Medalists at the FINA World Swimming Championships (25 m)
Commonwealth Games medallists in swimming
Commonwealth Games bronze medallists for Australia
Goodwill Games medalists in swimming
Swimmers at the 1998 Commonwealth Games
Competitors at the 2001 Goodwill Games
20th-century Australian people
21st-century Australian people
Medallists at the 1998 Commonwealth Games